Dhanraj Parimal Nathwani (born 5 February 1986) is an Indian industrialist and sports administrator, who is the group president of Reliance Industries Limited. He is also the president of Gujarat Cricket Association.

Personal life and Education 
Dhanraj is the son of Parimal Nathwani, Rajya Sabha MP. Dhanraj studied business from Regent's Business School, London. After graduation, he was posted as the group senior vice president at Reliance Industries.

Career 
In 2017, Nathwani was elected as the president of Gujarat State Football Association. In September he was elected as the vice president of the Gujarat Cricket Association. Nathwani was part the of core team for construction of the Narendra Modi Stadium, Ahmedabad.

Nathwani is vice-chairman of Dwarka Devasthan Samiti which manages the Dwarkadhish temple and development of facilities around the temple for the benefit of devotees. He also serves as the director in Reliance Group Support Services Private Limited which provides customized security solutions to industrial units.

References 

1986 births
Living people
Indian industrialists